Mockingbird is an album of covers by Allison Moorer released in 2008. Moorer covers songs by Nina Simone, Patti Smith, Cat Power, June Carter Cash, Joni Mitchell, as well as her sister Shelby Lynne.

Critical reception

Mockingbird was produced by Buddy Miller. In his review for AllMusic, Thom Jurek wrote that it "is a natural sounding set of covers that runs the gamut from rock and barrelhouse blues, to jazz, country, and traditional and indie folk." The title track, the only original song on the album, written by Moorer, is "a breezy acoustic ballad." Moore's rendition of Patti Smith's 'Dancing Barefoot' "has to be heard to be believed" and is "a contender for best track on the set." After raving over Moorer's creative and emotional interpretations of many of the album's other tracks, Jurek concludes by claiming that Mockingbird is her "warmest, most ambitious, and gutsy record yet."

Holly Gleason of American Songwriter writes, "Strength has always been Oscar-nominee Allison Moorer’s suit-and at a time when she enlists roots wizard Buddy Miller to ply an even more organic stew of instruments, the Alabama-born singer/songwriter makes herself even more vulnerable by jettisoning what she knows for what she feels, thinks, believes."

Jonathan Keefe of Slant Magazine says, "Moorer belongs in any serious conversation about the finest vocalists in modern popular music, and Mockingbird gives her ample opportunities to showcase her interpretive skills and to push herself in new directions."

Jim Caligiuri of the Austin Chronicle concludes his review with, "With only one self-penned song, the title track, Moorer's songwriting career is seemingly on hold. The effortless Mockingbird proves she doesn't need to write to make music that's all her own."

Metacritic gives the album a 67 Metascore based on 12 official critic reviews.

Track listing

Personnel
 Richard Bennett - acoustic guitar, electric guitar
 Chris Carmichael - strings, string arrangements
 Mike Compton - mandolin
 John Deaderick - keyboards
 Chris Donohue - bass guitar
 Steve Earle - electric guitar
 Connie Ellisor - violin
 Jim Grosjean - viola
 Jim Hoke - saxophone
 Tom Howard - string arrangements, conductor
 Ann McCrary - background vocals
 Regina McCrary - background vocals
 Phil Madeira - accordion, keyboards
 Kenny Malone - drums, percussion
 Buddy Miller - glockenspiel, acoustic guitar, electric guitar, percussion, background vocals
 Julie Miller - background vocals
 Allison Moorer - acoustic guitar, electric guitar, programming, lead vocals, background vocals
 The Nashville String Machine - strings
 Tim O'Brien - banjo
 Bryan Owings - drums
 Russ Pahl - steel guitar
 Carole Rabinowitz-Neuen - cello
 Tammy Rogers - fiddle
 Neil Rosengarden - trumpet
 Darrell Scott - bouzouki
 Pam Sixfin - violin

Chart performance

References

2008 albums
Allison Moorer albums
Albums produced by Buddy Miller
Covers albums
New Line Records albums